Rusubisir was an ancient Roman town of the Roman province of Mauretania Caesariensis. An exact location of the town is not currently known but it presumed to be in the territory around Tiza, Algeria.

Rusubisir was also the seat of an ancient bishopric which survives today as a titular see of the Roman Catholic Church. The current bishop is Mons. Juan Alberto Ayala.

References

Obispo Titular Actual: Juan Alberto Ayala Ramírez (Venezuela)
http://www.gcatholic.org/dioceses/former/t1484.htm

Catholic titular sees in Africa
Roman towns and cities in Mauretania Caesariensis
Ancient Berber cities